Bepridil (trade name Vascor) is an diamine calcium channel blocker once used to treat angina pectoris. It is no longer sold in the United States.

It is nonselective.

It has been discussed as a possible option in the treatment of atrial fibrillation.

It has been implicated in causing ventricular arrhythmia (torsades de pointes).

Ebola research

In June 2015 a research paper  was published finding bepridil to result in a 100% survival rate for mice exposed to ebola during an experiment searching for potential pharmaceutical ebola treatments; indicating its potential use in future ebola research and therapy.

SARS-CoV-2 research

A research paper 
showed that Bepridil inhibited cytopathogenic effects induced by SARS-CoV-2 in Vero E6 cells and in A549 cells in an in vitro assay.

References

External links
 

Calcium channel blockers
Pyrrolidines
Amines
Ethers